Pop is a cannibalistic spirit of Thai folklore. It manifests itself as a that likes to devour human viscera. Pop is related to the Phi Fa spirit.

Legends
A traditional legend says that a long time ago a flower could take control of them. Once the prince said the magic words and entered the body of an animal. His servant overheard those words, repeated them, and entered the body of the prince. The servant fooled people into thinking he was the prince. Seeing this, the prince quickly entered the body of a bird and rushed to tell the truth to his wife. Upon hearing this, the prince's wife had the servant's body destroyed and the prince challenged the false prince to enter the body of an animal. When the servant foolishly entered and took control of the animal's body, the real prince re-entered his own body.  The servant was unable to re-enter his body as it was destroyed. Henceforth, his revenant spirit goes from one body to another, eating its intestines.

Village legends say that this ghost lives inside a sorceress and leaves her body during sleep. Before the witch can die, the spirit has to find a body into which the Pop will be transmitted by consuming some saliva of the old sorceress.

These ghosts are powerful. If they succeed in haunting someone, they will eat that person's intestines during sleep. One way to get rid of them is to call in a healing dancer. This spirit doctor chases away the Pop by means of a spinning dance. When the patient is watching the dance, Pop will enter into the spinning movement and be chased from the body.

In 2007, following the mysterious and sudden deaths of four villagers in Kalasin Province's Sam Chai District, some 1000 residents, fearing the deaths were caused by evil spirits, raised some 35000 Thai Baht for an exorcism of Pop, allegedly dwelling in two of the female villagers.
In 2012, 10 males died suddenly in Pakse, Champa Province, Laos. People believed that these deaths were caused by Pop.

In academic terms
In the technical description, described as Pop is a social process. That is to deny people who are alienated from society or community. The accused is a Pop who will be disgusted and expelled from the congregation or village inhabited and noted that this belief only applies to certain regions, including the upper northeast and some areas in central only. It will not be found in other regions.

Modern adaptations
Thai films about Pop include 1989 movie Ban Phi Pop (บ้านผีปอบ), "The House of Pop", 1990 movies Ban Phi Pop 2 (บ้านผีปอบ 2), "The House of Pop 2", Lang Phao Phan Khot Phi Pop (ล้างเผ่าพันธุ์โคตรผีปอบ), "Holocaust of the Ogre Clan", Tanha Phra Chan (ตัณหาพระจันทร์), "Midnight Shade 2", and Pop Phi Hian (ปอบผีเฮี้ยน), "Pop is strong enough", all by Ekapan Banleurit, as well as Phi Lop Pop Mai Lop (ผีหลบปอบไม่หลบ), Phan Phi Pop (พันธุ์ผีปอบ), "The Breed of Pop", and Phi Pop Chom Tingtong (ผีปอบจอมติ้งต๊อง), "Pop at its Most Crazy". It also appears in movies with a mixture of horror and comedy such as 2008 film Ban Phi Poep (บ้านผีเปิบ), "The House of the Spirit Gorging itself", and  Krasue Fat Pop  (1990) with Chutima Naiyana, in which Krasue fights against Pop, judged to be a more malevolent spirit than Krasue by the villagers.

Chao Nang, "The Princess's Terror", 1992 Mae Nak Choe Pop (Mae Nak meets Pop), 1997 Pop Phi Fa and 2009 Pop Phi Fa (remake) are Thai television soap operas (ละคร) based on the Pop legend. This ghost is a popular subject in the same manner as Krasue or Krahang and humorous depictions, as well as gory ones, are common in Thai comics.

See also
Phi Fa
Krasue
Phraya Anuman Rajadhon

References

External links
Thai popular spirits
Thai movies with trailers
Thai horror movies
Thailand, Types of Thai Ghosts and Spirits
Khmer Movie - Kmouch Pjea Bart

Thai ghosts